NordicPhotos is a collection of seven Nordic image collections, Tiofoto, Mira, Greatshots, IMS, Siluet, Nordic and the royalty free collection, Simply North. Together it is one of the largest image collection of Nordic imagery, with over 5 million images and 300 photographers.

History

NordicPhotos was founded in 2000 by Arnaldur Gauti Johnson, Kjartan Dagbjartsson, Hreinn Ágústsson and Thor Ólafsson with funding from The Icelandic New Business Venture Fund. In 2003 the company started expanding and has for the past years, strengthened its foundation when acquiring some of the most well known and respected picture agencies in Sweden.  Companies with a history dating back more than 60 years. Today NordicPhotos has established itself as one of the leading picture agencies in the Nordic countries.

NordicPhotos has offices in Reykjavík, Iceland, Stockholm, Sweden and Oslo, Norway and represents many image collections in the Nordic countries.

Acquisitions information 2003-2008 

 Year 2003 IMS Bildbyrå, Sweden (founded 1946)
 Year 2003 Mira Bildarkiv, Sweden (founded 1978) 
 Year 2004 Tiofoto, Sweden (founded 1958)
 Year 2006 Greatshots, Sweden (founded 1992) 
 Year 2007 GV-Press, Norway (founded 1988)
 Year 2008 Spegla, Sweden (founded 2006)
 Year 2014 Gagnvirki, Iceland

Few of the professional photographers represented by NordicPhotos 
 Hans Hammarskiöld
 Lennart Olsson
 Georg Oddner
 Anders Petersen
 Sten Didrik Bellander
 Harry Dittmer
 Sven Gillsäter
 Rune Hassner
 Tore Johnson
 Hans Malmberg
 Pål-Nils Nilsson
 Micke Berg
 Nina Korhonen
 Thorbjörn Larsson
 Tina Miguel
 Conny Ekström 
 Theresia Bråkenhielm
 Moa Karlberg
 Richard Yngwe

See also
 Stock photography

References

External links 
 Nordicphotos
 IMS Vintage Photos
 Cepic member page
 News story about GV Press purchase
 Story from The Icelandic New Business Venture Fund (in Icelandic)

Photography companies of Iceland
Stock photography